Monte Faito is a mountain in the Monti Lattari, a small mountain range chain in the Campanian Pre-Apennines, on the Sorrentine Peninsula of southwestern Italy.

Geography

The mountain is mostly composed of limestone rocks, and has steep walls directly plunging into the sea at the Gulf of Salerno.

The name derives from the local dialect faggeto, referring to the great numbers of beeches in the mountain area.

Access
Monte Faito can be reached through a cable car from Castellammare di Stabia. Other communes nearby include Vico Equense and Cava de' Tirreni.

Faito
Faito
Geography of the Metropolitan City of Naples